This is a bibliography of the English actor, director, and writer Kenneth Branagh.

Screenplays

Plays

Non-fiction

References 

Branagh, Kenneth
Bibliography